Barry Hollis (second ¼ 1948) is an English former professional rugby league footballer who played in the 1970s. He played at club level for the Featherstone Rovers (Heritage No. 495), and York, as an occasional goal-kicking , i.e. number 11 or 12, during the era of contested scrums.

Playing career
Barry Hollis made his début for the Featherstone Rovers on Saturday 14 March 1970, he appears to have scored no drop-goals (or field-goals as they are currently known in Australasia), but prior to the 1974–75 season all goals, whether; conversions, penalties, or drop-goals, scored 2-points, consequently prior to this date drop-goals were often not explicitly documented, therefore '0' drop-goals may indicate drop-goals not recorded, rather than no drop-goals scored.

Challenge Cup Final appearances
Barry Hollis played as an interchange/substitute, i.e. number 15, (replacing left-, i.e. number 11, Alan Rhodes) in Featherstone Rovers' 33-14 victory over Bradford Northern in the 1973 Challenge Cup Final during the 1972–73 season at Wembley Stadium, London on Saturday 12 May 1973, in front of a crowd of 72,395.

County Cup Final appearances
Barry Hollis played right-, i.e. number 12, (replaced by interchange/substitute, i.e. number 15, Terry Ramshaw) and scored a drop goal in York's 8-18 defeat by Bradford Northern in the 1978 Yorkshire County Cup Final during the 1978–79 season at Headingley Rugby Stadium, Leeds on Saturday 28 October 1978.

Genealogical information
Barry Hollis' marriage to Geraldine (nee Sheard) was registered during third ¼ 1971 in Pontefract district.

References

External links
Search for "Hollis" at rugbyleagueproject.org
Search for "Hollis" at rugbyleagueproject.org
Steve Quinn. 1951 to 2016. Rest in Peace
Match Programme
Vince Farrar
June 2012

1948 births
Living people
English rugby league players
Featherstone Rovers players
Rugby league players from Pontefract
Rugby league second-rows
York Wasps players